Anarchie is the debut studio album by French rapper SCH, released on 27 May 2016 by Braabus Music, Def Jam and Universal.

Track listing
"Anarchie" – 5:48
"Trop énorme" – 3:33
"Je la connais" – 3:39
"Cartine Cartier" (featuring Sfera Ebbasta) – 3:29
"Le doc" – 4:38
"Neuer" – 3:30
"Alleluia" – 3:59
"Allô Maman" – 3:24
"Quand on était mômes" – 5:22
"Dix-neuf" – 3:36
"Himalaya" – 4:38
"Essuie tes larmes" – 2:36
"Murcielago" – 3:33

Charts

Weekly charts

Year-end charts

Certifications

References

2016 debut albums
French-language albums